Florence De Jong (née Baga) (1894 – 1990) was an English theatre and cinema organist. 

De Jong was born in Holborn, London, and learned piano at school. She had three sisters, all professional musicians, as was their father. The youngest sister, Ena Baga, was also an organist, billed as "Queen of the Keyboard". As well as cinemas, she also played on cruise liners.

She appeared as a castaway on the BBC Radio programme Desert Island Discs on 7 April 1973.

Olivier Award winner Martyn Jacques, of the band Tiger Lillies, was her pupil, and has dedicated a performance to her memory.

References

External links
 Florence De Jong 1939 British Pathe newsreel

1894 births
1990 deaths
Place of death missing
English women pianists
English organists
Women organists
Theatre organists
People from Clerkenwell
English people of Italian descent
People from Holborn